Toward the Unknown, originally called Flight Test Center and titled Brink of Hell in its UK release, is a 1956 American war film about the dawn of supersonic flight filmed on location at Edwards Air Force Base. Starring William Holden, Lloyd Nolan and Virginia Leith, the film features the screen debut of James Garner.

Toward the Unknown was directed by Mervyn LeRoy and written by Beirne Lay, Jr. who had also penned the novel and screenplay for Twelve O'Clock High (1949), and later screenplays for Above and Beyond (1952) and Strategic Air Command (1955). The film's title is derived from the motto of the Air Force Flight Test Center, Ad Inexplorata.

Plot
USAF Major Lincoln Bond was captured during the Korean War and subjected to torture, finally cracking after 14 months and signing a confession used for propaganda. Upon his release, he took a year to recover from the ordeal before showing up at the Flight Test Center at Edwards Air Force Base, hoping to return to work as a test pilot. His old buddy, Colonel McKee, tries his best for him, but base commander Brigadier General Banner turns him down because he does not trust him to be stable. A complication is that the general's secretary and love interest, Connie Mitchell, is an old flame. Bond presses for a job and accepts the general's offer of routine flying in support. Banner is a hands-on leader, taking the most dangerous assignments himself.

When Bond flies the new Gilbert XF-120 fighter, he finds dangerous structural problems that threaten its imminent acceptance by the Air Force. He claims he did not press the aircraft beyond its design specifications, but no one believes him, especially H. G. Gilbert, the head of the company that built the fighter. When the general tries to replicate Bond's maneuvers, nothing untoward happens. Afterward, Bond sees Banner nearly collapse in the locker room, but Banner shrugs off the incident.

The two begin to trust each other, especially when Banner is endangered in a test flight and Bond calmly and expertly comes to the rescue. Then Major Joe Craven, another close friend of Bond's, is killed when a wing of his XF-120 tears away, confirming Bond's warning. Bond's rehabilitation is endangered when a drunk Major "Bromo" Lee, Banner's top test pilot, tries to pick a fight with him at the officers club. Bond reacts badly to being held by a bystander, invoking memories of his Korean War imprisonment, and punches Bromo twice.

With an appreciation that both men were to blame for the altercation, Banner gives Bond the assignment he craves: the rocket-powered X-2, which is designed to fly to the edge of outer space. The general insists, however, on piloting the first test flight at full power, despite strong pressure from his superior, Lieutenant General Bryan Shelby, to let a younger man take on the dangerous job. When Bond is assigned to fly the last half-power test before the main flight, he goes to full power without authorization and barely survives a high-altitude bailout when the aircraft goes out of control. The base flight surgeon tells Banner that only a young, fit person could have survived, leading the general to accept a promotion and transfer. He recommends Colonel McKee as his successor. Although Banner offers to take Connie with him to his new assignment, she decides to stay with Bond.

Cast
As appearing in Toward the Unknown, (main roles and screen credits identified):

 William Holden as Major Lincoln Bond  
 Lloyd Nolan as Brigadier General Bill Banner
Virginia Leith as Connie Mitchell
 Charles McGraw as Colonel R. H. "Mickey" McKee
 Murray Hamilton as Major "Bromo" Lee
 Paul Fix as Lieutenant General Bryan Shelby
 James Garner as Major Joe Craven
 L. Q. Jones as 2nd Lieutenant Sweeney
 Karen Steele as Polly Craven
 Bartlett Robinson as Senator Black
 Malcolm Atterbury as Hank
 Ralph Moody as H. G. Gilbert 
 Maura Murphy as Sarah McKee
 Carol Kelly as	Debbie
 Jon Provost as Major Craven's Son (uncredited)

Production

Like some other major stars of the era, Holden decided to try producing films himself, setting up Toluca Productions. In the end, however, he found the added work too much, and Toward the Unknown was the only Toluca film.<ref>Mankiewicz, Ben. "Toward the Unknown." "Turner Classic Movies, 2011.</ref> As originally cast, starring roles had Clark Gable as General Banner and Gregory Peck as Major Bond, but contractual problems required a recasting, with Holden taking on the role of star as well as producer.

James Garner, who made his film debut on the movie, says director Mervyn LeRoy tried to "whip" him. "I jumped right back at him," he said. "He was famous for it, he'd just pick one guy and lord it over him for the whole picture. If he hadn't taken his pills early in the morning, he was nasty."Toward the Unknown was produced with the full cooperation of the United States Air Force with principal photography taking place over the winter in 1955. As the first film to exploit the USAF's race into space in the X-plane program, the Toward the Unknowns tagline stated: "The screen's first story of man-piloted rocket ships, U.S.A.!" The extensive use of the Edwards AFB facility and its emergency dry lake beds, Rosamond Lake and Rogers Dry Lake, as well as the related air force community area, lend an air of authenticity to the production. Air Research and Development Command (ARDC) Technical Advisors Major Price Henry, Lieutenant Colonel Ralph Martin and Lieutenant Colonel Frank Everest Jr. served as technical advisors to the production.

Right out of the headlines of the day, Toward the Unknown also dealt with the controversial issue of military personnel undergoing torture and brainwashing, with the marketing campaign exploiting the mental anguish the character felt. Holden's character closely parallels three USAF pilots, Colonel Walker "Bud" Mahurin, an Air Force double ace who was shot down in Korea and tortured before signing confessions of war crimes, Lieutenant Colonel Everest, who had a similar prison experience after being shot down in China during World War II, and Capt. Milburn G. Apt, who died after losing control of the X-2 minutes after becoming the first pilot to exceed Mach 3. Holden and Everest, who was acting as the film's "air boss", became close friends during the production. In a similar manner, General Banner's character was based on Major General Albert Boyd, the first Commander of the USAF Flight Test Center at Edwards AFB.

Aircraft in the productionToward the Unknown was a showcase of the contemporary United States Air Force fleet of combat aircraft: Convair C-131 Samaritan, Convair F-102 Delta Dagger, Douglas B-66 Destroyer, Lockheed F-94 Starfire, McDonnell F-101 Voodoo, North American F-86 Sabre, North American F-100 Super Sabre, Republic F-84F Thunderstreak, and Sikorsky H-19D Chickasaw, shown on the ground and in the air. Unusual stock footage includes a rocket sled being tested, the use of the Boeing YKB-29T Superfortress aerial tanker with a F-100, F-101, and B-66 being fueled, and a Republic EF-84G Thunderjet in a Zero length launch. Also appearing in background shots were the Beech C-45 Expeditor, Boeing B-47 Stratojet, Convair B-36 Peacemaker, Douglas C-47 Skytrain, Lockheed T-33 Shooting Star, North American B-25 Mitchell, North American B-45 Tornado, and the Republic F-84 Thunderjet. The final aerial sequence is derived from an air show held at the base and depicts the 1955 version of the Thunderbirds air demonstration team, flying Republic F-84F Thunderstreak fighters in a scene described as "special ariobatics"[sic] in the credits.

The Bell X-2, its Boeing EB-50D mother ship, Douglas D-558-2 Skyrocket, and Douglas X-3 Stiletto are also featured as the experimental aircraft being tested at Edwards AFB. Footage of the mocked-up Convair XF-92 was used to depict the later F-102 fighter in the opening crash scene while the surviving Martin XB-51 bomber prototype stands in as the fictional "Gilbert XF-120" fighter.

ReceptionToward the Unknown was critically reviewed as an example of the "actor-turned-producer fraternity", with screen idol William Holden heavily involved in the production. The film also mirrored the exploits of real-life test pilots such as Chuck Yeager who were the subjects of headlines all over the world. Bosley Crowther of The New York Times, summed up its impact, however, as "The principals, to put it briefly, are never as fascinating as the aircraft pointed at the future in 'Toward the Unknown'."

Considered on its merits as a "flying" film that is "well worth seeing", later aviation film reviewers likewise bemoaned the "typical story about personal conflict and a woman's faith that infected all too many flying films." Following up on the art-or-artifice depiction, latter-day reviewer Christopher McQuain states that, "Finding anything of interest in 'Toward the Unknown' depends on whether you consider the film as art or artifact; it is not a good movie, but it is a fascinating, revealing one. It is utterly transparent Cold War propaganda, with delighted displays of military aircraft in action, an eager, anxious glimpse forward to the Space Race, and an interest in human-scale affairs so desultory as to make the machines and the ability to build and fly them seem much more important than the complications and consequences of militarism and war waged ..."

Home media
Although occasionally shown on television, and screened at the Edwards AFB theater in 2006 to celebrate the 50th anniversary of its original premiere, Toward the Unknown was not released on home video until 2011. After sorting out rights with Holden's estate, the film was issued on DVD as part of the Warner Archive Collection.

See also
List of American films of 1956

References

Notes

Citations

Bibliography

 Boyne, Walter. "Attack: The Story of the XB-51, Martin's Phantom Strike Ship!" Airpower, Vol. 8, No. 4, July 1978.
 Capua, Michelangelo. William Holden: A Biography. Jefferson, North Carolina: McFarland Press, 2010. .
 Evans, Alun. Brassey's Guide to War Films. Dulles, Virginia: Potomac Books, 2000. .
 Farmer, James H. "Hollywood Goes To Edwards." Air Classics, Vol. 25, No. 8, August 1989.
 Hardwick, Jack and Ed Schnepf. "A Buff's Guide to Aviation Movies". Air Progress Aviation, Vol. 7, No. 1, Spring 1983.
 Lerner, Preston. "And the Oscar Goes to...the Airplane!" Air & Space Smithsonian, Vol. 27, No. 5, October/November 2012.
 Peterson, Wayne. "Toward The Unknown: Filming the 1956 Warner Brothers Classic." Wings'', Vol. 32, No. 3. June 2002.

External links
 
 
 
 Toward the Unknown fan site

1956 films
1956 romantic drama films
1950s American films
1950s English-language films
American romantic drama films
American aviation films
Films about test pilots
Films directed by Mervyn LeRoy